Tea tree may refer to:

Plants
Camellia sinensis (aka Thea sinensis), from which black, green, oolong and white tea are all obtained
Melaleuca species in the family Myrtaceae, sources for tea tree oil
Leptospermum, also in the family Myrtaceae, source for Manuka honey
 Kunzea ericoides or White tea-tree, a tree or shrub of New Zealand
 Taxandria parviceps, also in the family Myrtaceae
 species of Lycium, including
 Lycium europaeum or European teatree
 Lycium barbarum or Duke of Argyll's Tea Tree

Geography 
Tea Tree, the former name of Ti-Tree, Northern Territory,  a town and locality in Australia
Tea Tree Gully, a council in Adelaide, Australia
Westfield Tea Tree Plaza, a shopping centre in Adelaide, Australia
Tea Tree, Tasmania, a locality in Southern Tasmania

See also
Ti-Tree (disambiguation)